Glen Grout (31 May 1952 – 24 August 2016) was a Canadian diver. He competed in the men's 10 metre platform event at the 1976 Summer Olympics.

In May 1971, he won the 3-metre event in the British Columbia diving championships with a total score of 434.65.

References

External links
 

1952 births
2016 deaths
Canadian male divers
Olympic divers of Canada
Divers at the 1976 Summer Olympics
Divers from Vancouver
Divers at the 1974 British Commonwealth Games
Commonwealth Games competitors for Canada